Roman Postl (1969 in Proboštov – September 8, 2008 in Chomutov) was a Czech spree killer and drug addict who killed five people. The first murder was committed in 1998, for which he was sentenced for murder and stayed in prison for 13 years. In April 2008 he was prematurely released for good behaviour. At a gas station in Předlice in Ústí nad Labem, he murdered Jiří Šťovíček. He shot him in the head and stole 15,000 crowns and a notebook.

Postl died in a Chomutov hospital where he was taken with gunfire wounds suffered from a firefight with the police after the murder of Van Tinh. During the shootout, intervening police officer Roman Jedlička was also injured, also dying in a hospital from his wounds. Roman Postl was 39 years old at the time of his death.

Victims 

 1   Jan Štencl (17) - shot in 1998
 2.  Karel Diviš (46) - businessman, shot on August 1, 2008
 3.  Jiří Šťovíček (20) - gas pump brigadier, shot on August 2, 2008
 4.  Dao Van Tinh (20) - Vietnamese barman, shot on August 3, 2008
 5.  Roman Jedlička (28) - policeman, shot on August 3, 2008

External links 

 aha-online.cz
 www.blesk.cz
 www.policie-cr.cz
 www.mvcr.cz
 zpravy.idnes.cz

1969 births
Deaths by firearm in the Czech Republic
2008 deaths
Czech spree killers
People from Teplice District